Pavel Bělobrádek (born 25 December 1976) is a Czech politician who was the leader of the KDU-ČSL from 2010 to 2019.

He served as the deputy prime minister and minister of Science and Research in Bohuslav Sobotka's Cabinet 29 January 2014 to 13 December 2017.

References

KDU-ČSL MPs
Czech veterinarians
Living people
1976 births
People from Náchod
People with multiple sclerosis
Government ministers of the Czech Republic
Leaders of KDU-ČSL
KDU-ČSL Government ministers
Members of the Chamber of Deputies of the Czech Republic (2017–2021)
Members of the Chamber of Deputies of the Czech Republic (2013–2017)
Members of the Chamber of Deputies of the Czech Republic (2021–2025)